The BBC Women's Footballer of the Year is an annual award given to the best women's footballer of the year. Finalists are shortlisted by women's football media experts, and the winner is decided by fan voting from all around the world.

Winners

Records

Only those with multiple wins will be listed.

Wins by player

Wins by club

Wins by nationality

See also
 List of sports awards honoring women

References

Awards established in 2015
BBC World Service
Women's Footballer
Women's association football trophies and awards
Women's association football player of the year awards